The Ministry of Mines and Mining Development is the government ministry responsible for mines and mining in Zimbabwe. The incumbent minister is Winston Chitando. It oversees:
 Zimbabwe Geological Survey
 Zimbabwe Government Mining Engineer
 Minerals Marketing Corporation of Zimbabwe

References

Government of Zimbabwe
Zimbabwe